Brevard High School is a public high school in Brevard, North Carolina, one of three along with Rosman High School and Davidson River School in the Transylvania County Schools district. The highschool has experienced a slight incline in student population going from 723 in 2012–2013 to around 770 in the 2017–2018 school year.

The school was located on South Broad Street from 1925 until the 1959–60 school year, when the campus on Country Club Road opened. Until court-ordered desegregation began in 1963, Brevard High was white, and black students attended a school in Hendersonville.

Athletics
The school's teams are the Blue Devils. Sports include basketball, cross-country, golf, football, soccer, track, volleyball, and wrestling. The school competes on the NCHSAA 2A level. The football team won the state championship in 1982, when they went undefeated. The football team is currently coached by T. Craig Pritchett who took over the program in 2014. Since then Coach Pritchett has developed many college athletes from the Division III to the Division I levels.  In 2016 Pritchett took the football team to the 3rd round of the 2A North Carolina playoffs.

Brevard has had a longstanding athletic rivalry with the Hendersonville High School Bearcats; incidents with unruly spectators led in 1963 to a ban on competitions between the two teams without special permission.

Notable alumni
 Mickey Marvin, former NFL offensive guard and 2x Super Bowl champion with the Oakland/Los Angeles Raiders
 Steve Penn, handball player who represented Team USA at the 1996 Summer Olympics
 James Suttles, filmmaker
 Tanner Ellenberger, former Outside Linebacker for the Appalachian State Mountaineers, and role model for the ILC

References

Public high schools in North Carolina
Education in Transylvania County, North Carolina